Cleome pubescens can refer to:

Cleome pubescens Sieber ex Steud., a synonym of Cleome gynandra L.
Cleome pubescens Sims, a synonym of Cleome spinosa Jacq.